"Overdrive" is an English language song by Swedish singer Ola, full name Ola Svensson, that reached the top of the Swedish Singles Chart. It was released through Universal Records.

Charts

Weekly charts

Year-end charts

References

2010 singles
2010 songs
Number-one singles in Sweden
Ola Svensson songs
Songs written by Dimitri Stassos
Songs written by Sharon Vaughn
Songs written by Ola Svensson